Tempo is a 2003 film directed by Eric Styles and starring Melanie Griffith, Rachael Leigh Cook, and Hugh Dancy.

Premise
The film is set primarily in Paris and concentrates on a love triangle that gets increasingly complicated as criminal enterprises go wrong.

Cast
Melanie Griffith as Sarah James
Rachael Leigh Cook as Jenny Travile
Hugh Dancy as Jack Ganzer
Malcolm McDowell as Walter Shrenger
Art Malik as George Maldonado
David La Haye as Bayliss

References

External links
 

2003 films
Films set in Paris
British heist films
Canadian heist films
French heist films
English-language Canadian films
English-language French films
English-language Luxembourgian films
Universal Pictures direct-to-video films
2000s English-language films
2000s Canadian films
2000s British films
2000s French films